The Kia Ora Incident is an incident that took place in 1984, at a time when the use of Māori phrases was uncommon in New Zealand. An Auckland telephone operator, Naida Glavish, was instructed to stop using "kia ora" when greeting callers after the post office had received a complaint. She refused to do so and was consequently demoted, with the whole affair attracting much public interest. She was later given back her original job. The Postmaster-General, Rob Talbot, convinced the Prime Minister, Robert Muldoon, to overturn the prohibition on kia ora.

This event is considered key in the movement to revitalise Te Reo Maori. A similar event took place in 2014 when KiwiYo Whangarei employees were banned from using the term "kia ora".

References

Māori language
Controversies in New Zealand
1984 controversies
1984 in New Zealand
Linguistic discrimination